NOM*d is a New Zealand fashion design label established in 1986 by Margarita and Chris Robertson. The label operates from the historic city of Dunedin, in the Otago Region of New Zealand's South Island.

In 1998, NOM*d showed at London Fashion Week. NOM*d was worn by musician and celebrity Rihanna in her advertisement for Puma.

References

External links

Companies established in 1986
1986 establishments in New Zealand
Companies based in Dunedin
Clothing companies of New Zealand
New Zealand fashion